Smita Singh (born 16 December 1980) is an Indian actress who appears in the television show Bhagyavidhaata and is known for her portrayal of leading vamp character Punpunwali. She has also acted in the TV serial Kkusum and in Zee TV's Hitler Didi for which she was nominated for best actor in a comedy role by Indian Telly Awards. In 2016, she played the negative role of Kosi Devi in Colors TV's popular show Thapki Pyar Ki.

Personal life
Smita Singh was born on 16 December 1980, in Lucknow, to Dr Pratap Singh an anesthetist and Veena Singh a home maker. She has a younger sister Smriti Singh. She went to Cathedral school Lucknow, then to I. T. College Lucknow and did her graduation from Lucknow University. 
From a very young age she started working in plays and worked for television as a child actor in Lucknow. In 2001 she moved to Mumbai.

Television

Films

Reality shows

References

Additional sources
 No place for simple people in TV industry: Smita Singh - The Times of India
 Smita Singh lies about illness – Times Of India
 Smita Singh’s moonlighting activities - Times Of India
 Smita Singh catches a few winks in the middle of a shot! - Times Of India
 Punpunwali harassed! - Times Of India
 I want to stay away from saas-bahu sagas: TV actress Smita

Indian television actresses
Living people
1980 births